The Sunrise 4A Region is a part of the Nevada Interscholastic Activities Association and is one of two conferences in Southern Nevada 4A high school athletics.  The Sunrise Region consists of large schools in Henderson, Nevada and on the eastern parts of Las Vegas and North Las Vegas, Nevada.  There are two division in the Sunrise 4A Region, Northeast and Southeast.  The Sunrise 4A Region was a part of the Southern Nevada 4-A Region, until the conference was divided into two separate regions before the 2000-01 school year due to the constant expansion and development of new high schools in the Las Vegas Valley. Sunrise Mountain High School joined the Northeast Division most recently, during the 2009-10 school year.

Current members

Of these schools; Rancho, Las Vegas, Eldorado and Basic are charter members of the Sunrise 4A League, and are former Sunrise Division schools along with Western High School.  Chaparral and Valley, former members of the Sunset Division, joined the league in the 1990s.

Moapa Valley High School and Boulder City High School have affiliate member status in tennis.

Enrollment figures as reported in each school's Clark County School District 2009–10 School Accountability Summary Report.  Sunrise Mountain's enrollment figures based on that reported by an independent source.

Proposed realignment 
In June 2011, the NIAA's Southern Realignment Committee approved a realignment of Sunrise 4A Region, Sunset 4A Region and Southern 3A Region that would place 24 teams from Class 4A into Class 4A–Division I and 13 teams, including 3A members Boulder City, Moapa Valley and Virgin Valley, into Class 4A–Division II.  The teams were placed into divisions using a point-based rubric that took into account each school's finish in all sports for the 2009–10 and 2010–11 school years. Points were awarded for qualifying for the postseason in most sports, with higher point totals awarded for postseason victories and teams that won region or state titles.

The proposal will be discussed by the NIAA's Board of Governors in late June 2011 and is expected to be approved by the board in October 2011 at a meeting in Las Vegas scheduled for October 2011.

The proposed lineup for the two divisions for the Sunrise 4A Region are:

Sports
The Sunrise 4A Region sponsors thirteen sports divided into three seasons: Fall, Winter, and Spring.
Sports that are competed during the Fall Season include:
Cross Country (Boys and Girls)
Football
Golf (Girls)
Soccer (Boys)
Tennis (Boys and Girls)
Volleyball (Girls)

Sports that are competed during the Winter Season include:
Basketball (Boys and Girls)
Bowling (Boys and Girls)
Soccer (Girls)
Wrestling

Sports that are competed during the Spring Season include:
Baseball
Golf (Boys)
Softball
Swimming and Diving (Boys and Girls)
Track and Field (Boys and Girls)
Volleyball (Boys)

Several sports including Roller Hockey and Lacrosse are sponsored by some of the conference's schools but are independent of the NIAA and the Sunrise Conference.

Football rivalries
There are seven prominent football rivals involving schools within the Sunrise 4A region; one, the Bone Game between Las Vegas and Rancho, is the oldest, continual football rivalry in the state, starting in the 1930s.

Within the Sunrise 4A Region

Outside of the Sunrise 4A Region

2009-10 champions

2008-09 champions

Notes and references

See also
Nevada Interscholastic Activities Association
Sunset 4A Region
Northern Nevada 3A Region
Northern Nevada 4A Region
Southern Nevada 2A Region
Sunrise 4A Region
Sunset 4A Region

External links
Official website of the Nevada Interscholastic Athletics Association
High School Sports Coverage by the Las Vegas Review-Journal

Nevada high school sports conferences
Sports competitions in Las Vegas